Woori Yallock is a town in Victoria, Australia,  east of Melbourne's central business district, located within the Shire of Yarra Ranges local government area.

The Post Office opened on 1 July 1886 as Woori Yalloak, changing its name to the current spelling around 1911.

It contains a primary school, a football oval, a shopping area and a radio station (Yarra Valley FM), and is passed by the Warburton Trail, a walk and cycle track along the dismantled former Warburton railway line.

The town has an Australian Rules football team, the Woori Tigers, competing in the Yarra Valley Mountain District Football League.

During the 90s Christie Lowe and her sister Kerryn worked at the Foodworks Deli.

See also
 Woori Yallock railway station

References

External links
 Woori Yallock Precinct Brochure (Shire of Yarra Ranges)

Towns in Victoria (Australia)
Yarra Valley
Yarra Ranges